Diario Vanguardia is a newspaper published in Paraguay.

References

External links
Website 

Newspapers published in Paraguay